Restrepia teaguei, commonly called the Teague's restrepia, is a species of orchid endemic to Ecuador (Zamora-Chinchipe).

References

External links 

teaguei
Endemic orchids of Ecuador
Zamora-Chinchipe Province